Dimitar Kostov (born 24 September 1907, date of death unknown) was a Bulgarian cross-country skier. He competed in the men's 18 kilometre event at the 1936 Winter Olympics.

References

1907 births
Year of death missing
Bulgarian male cross-country skiers
Olympic cross-country skiers of Bulgaria
Cross-country skiers at the 1936 Winter Olympics
Place of birth missing